Omasuyos (Hispanicized spelling) or Uma Suyu (Aymara uma water, suyu region, "water region") is a province in the La Paz Department in Bolivia. Its capital is Achacachi (Jach'a Q'achi).

The province is situated in the Altiplano bordered to the north by the Muñecas Province, to the northeast by the Larecaja Province, to the southeast by the Los Andes Province, to the south and west by Lake Titicaca and to the northwest by the Eliodoro Camacho Province.

Geography 
The Cordillera Real traverses the province. Some of the highest mountains of the province are listed below:

Subdivision
The province is divided into six municipalities.

°  including separated cantons

Huarina and Santiago de Huata, and Huatajata and Chua Cocani received the status of municipalities in 2005, 2009, and 2010, respectively. Formerly they were cantons of the Achacachi Municipality.

See also 
 Ch'iyar Juqhu River

References

External links

Provinces of La Paz Department (Bolivia)